Toni Leuthe (21 November 1922 – 2008) was a German weightlifter. He competed in the men's lightweight event at the 1952 Summer Olympics.

References

External links
 

1922 births
2008 deaths
German male weightlifters
Olympic weightlifters of Germany
Weightlifters at the 1952 Summer Olympics
People from Singen
Sportspeople from Freiburg (region)
20th-century German people